Branna may refer to:

Dolní Branná, village in the Hradec Králové Region of the Czech Republic
Horní Branná, village and municipality in the Liberec Region of the Czech Republic
Branná, village and municipality in the Olomouc Region of the Czech Republic
Bränna, village in Mellerud Municipality, Västra Götaland County, Sweden